Jean-Samuel Raobelina, MS (27 June 1928 - 30. June 2001) was Roman Catholic Bishop of Tsiroanomandidy.

Life 
Jean-Samuel Raobelina entered the Congregation of Missionaries of Our Lady of La Salette and was ordained a priest on March 21, 1959.

Pope Paul VI appointed him Bishop of Quilmes on April 27, 1978. The Archbishop of Antananarivo, Victor Cardinal Razafimahatratra, SJ, ordained him bishop on July 9 of the same year; Co-consecrators were Jean-Guy Rakodondravahatra MS, Bishop of Ihosy, and Francesco Vòllaro OSST, Bishop of Ambatondrazaka.

References 

2001 deaths
1928 births
Malagasy people
21st-century Roman Catholic bishops
20th-century Roman Catholic bishops